The 1930 Monaco Grand Prix was a Grand Prix motor race held at the Circuit de Monaco on 6 April 1930. Frenchman René Dreyfus won the race in a privateer Bugatti, ahead of the works Bugattis of Louis Chiron and Guy Bouriat. The race was somewhat marred by allegations of race-fixing.

Entries

Starting grid

Note: grid slots were determined by drawing lots (Bowes, Ferrari and Frankl had provisionally been due to start on the first, third and fourth row, respectively).

Classification

Race

References

External links

Monaco
Monaco Grand Prix
Grand Prix